Katsarosite is a rarely occurring mineral from the mineral class of organic compounds with the chemical composition Zn (C2O4)·2H2O and is therefore a water-containing zinc(II) oxalate or the zinc salt of oxalic acid.

Katsarosite is categorized in the humboldtine group as the Zn analogue of humboldtine (Fe (C2O4)·2H2O). It is the second Zn-bearing oxalate mineral after alterite.

Katsarosite crystallizes in the monoclinic crystal system and appears as crystals that are mostly fine granular to earthy, usually rounded with an average diameter of 30 μm. The color depends on the iron (Fe2+) content, ranging from pure white to yellow in Fe-rich speciments.

The mineral is named after Īraklīs Katsaros (ΗΡΑΚΛΗΣ ΚΑΤΣΑΡΟΣ) of Lavrion who has led as guide a large number of scientific archeological and mineralogical sampling tours through the ancient mining system of Lavrion. His help enabled more than 100 publications in the field of archeology/mining history and mineralogy/geology. His assistance is further acknowledged in dozens of peer-reviewed scientific papers. 

Type material is deposited in the collections of the Institut für Mineralogie und Kristallographie der Universität Wien, Althanstrasse 14, 1090 Vienna, Austria, catalogue number HS13.977 (holotype); the Mineralogical Museum of Lavrio, Andrea Kordella Ave., 19500 Lavrio, Greece, catalogue number T3201 (cotype).

References

External links 

 Mineralien Atlas
 
 Mindat.org
 Webmineral.com

Organic minerals
Monoclinic minerals
Oxalate minerals
Zinc minerals